Arthur John "Bud" Teachout (February 27, 1904 – May 11, 1985) was a pitcher in Major League Baseball. He played for the Chicago Cubs and St.Louis Cardinals.

References

External links

1904 births
1985 deaths
Major League Baseball pitchers
Chicago Cubs players
Baseball players from Los Angeles
Occidental Tigers baseball players